Volkslied (literally: folk song) is a genre of popular songs in German which are traditionally sung. While many of them were first passed orally, several collections were published from the late 18th century. Later, some popular songs were also included in this classification.

History 
The earliest songs in German appeared in the 12th century. Art songs were created by minstrels and meistersinger while cantastoria (Bänkelsänger) sang songs in public that were orally transmitted. Song collections were written from the late 15th century, such as Lochamer-Liederbuch and Glogauer Liederbuch. Georg Forster's Frische teutsche Liedlein was first printed in 1536.

In the period of Sturm und Drang, poets and authors became interested in that which they saw as simple, close to nature, original, and unspoiled (nach dem ). Johann Gottfried Herder coined the term 'Volkslied' in the late 18th century, and published Von deutscher Art und Kunst (On German ways and artistry) in 1771. In 1778/79, a collection Volkslieder was published, promoted by Johann Wolfgang von Goethe and Gotthold Ephraim Lessing, which mentioned neither an editor nor authors, in an attempt to suggest the songs as an expression of the soul of the people. Friedrich Silcher (1789–1860) composed a great number of Lieder, many of which became Volkslieder, and he edited collections of Volkslieder.

In the middle of the 18th century, the Berliner Liederschule promoted songs with simple melodies im Volkston (i.e. in the Volkslied style). Songs written following the concept include "Das Wandern ist des Müllers Lust" and "O Täler weit, o Höhen".

In the early 20th century, the repertoire was broadened by workers' songs and students' songs. In 1914, John Meier founded the Deutsches Volksliedarchiv, a research and archive of Volkslied. The Wandervogel movement turned to singing while wandering, with the collection  published in 1909, and reprinted until 1933.

Collections 
 Achim von Arnim, Clemens Brentano: Des Knaben Wunderhorn. 1806/1808.
 Andreas Kretzschmer, Anton Wilhelm von Zuccalmaglio: Deutsche Volkslieder mit ihren Originalweisen. 2 vols. Berlin 1838/1841.
 Rochus Freiherr von Liliencron: Die historischen Volkslieder der Deutschen vom 13. bis 16. Jahrhundert. 5 vols. Leipzig 1865–1869, reprographied reprint 1966.
 Ludwig Erk, Franz Magnus Böhme: Deutscher Liederhort. Leipzig 1893/1894.
 August Linder: Deutsche Weisen – Die beliebtesten Volks- und geistlichen Lieder für Klavier (with text), ca. 1900
  (ed.):  Melody edition with chords. Reprint of the 10th edition, Leipzig 1913 (ED 3586). Schott, Mainz 1983, .
 Bertold Marohl, Der neue Zupfgeigenhansl, 121 young Lieder with texts, melodies, numbered chords and a einer finger positions for guitar. Mainz (et al.), Schott 1983 
 , Der Spielmann – Liederbuch für Jugend und Volk, Matthias Grünewald Verlag Mainz; 1st ed. 1914 [(katholische) Quickborn Bewegung], with many expanded reprints, certainly up to 1976
 , Unsere Lieder – Ein Liederbuch für die wandernde Jugend; Sauerland Verlag, Iserlohn, 1st ed. 1921.
 Hermann Böse, Das Volkslied für Heim und Wanderung; Arbeiterjugend Verlag Berlin, 1st ed. 1922, reprints 1923, 1927.
 : Verklingende Weisen. Lothringischer Verlags- und Hilfsverein, Metz 1926 (vol. 1).
 Hermann Peter Gehricke, Karl Vötterle, Bruder Singer, Lieder unseres Volkes; Bährenreiter Edition 1250, Kassel 1951; 1974 new ed.
 Heiner Wolf, Unser fröhlicher Gesell, Ein Liederbuch für alle Tage, Möseler Verlag Wolfenbüttel \ Voggenreiter Verlag Bad Godesberg, 1955, reprints at least until 1964
 Josef Gregor, Friedrich Klausmeier, Egon Kraus: Europäische Lieder in den Ursprachen. Vol. 1: Die romanischen und germanischen Sprachen, Berlin 1957.
 Ernst Klusen: Das Mühlrad, Ein Liederbuch der Heimat, Kempen\Niederrhein 1966
 Klusen: Volkslieder aus 500 Jahren – Texte und Noten mit Begleitakkorden. Fischer, Frankfurt 1978.
 Klusen: Deutsche Lieder. Texts und melodies. Insel, Frankfurt/M. 1980, .
 Willy Schneider: Deutsche Weisen – Die beliebtesten Volkslieder für Klavier mit Text. Lausch & Zweigle, Stuttgart 1958.
 Wolfgang Steinitz: Deutsche Volkslieder demokratischen Charakters aus 6 Jahrhunderten. 2 vols, Berlin 1953, 1956.
 Klingende Brücke: Liederatlas europäischer Sprachen der Klingenden Brücke. Vol. 1: Bonn 2001, vol. 2: Bonn 2002, vol. 3: Bonn 2003, vol. 4: Bonn 2006

Volkslieder 

 Ach, wie ist's möglich dann

 
Als der Großvater die Großmutter nahm

 Ännchen von Tharau
 Auf der Lüneburger Heide

Backe, backe Kuchen

Bolle reiste jüngst zu Pfingsten

 

 Das Wandern ist des Müllers Lust

 Der Kuckuck und der Esel
 Der Mond ist aufgegangen

 Der treue Husar

 Die Gedanken sind frei

 Drei Chinesen mit dem Kontrabass

 Du, du liegst mir im Herzen

 Ein Heller und ein Batzen

Es tönen die Lieder

 Geh aus, mein Herz, und suche Freud

 De Hamborger Veermaster
 Hänschen klein

 Heidenröslein to the 1829 melody by Heinrich Werner

 Ich hab die Nacht geträumet

 In einem kühlen Grunde
 Innsbruck, ich muss dich lassen

 Kein schöner Land in dieser Zeit

 Kommt ein Vogel geflogen

 Leise rieselt der Schnee

 Muss i denn zum Städtele hinaus

 Nun ruhen alle Wälder

 

 O Tannenbaum

 Stille Nacht, heilige Nacht

 Weißt du, wie viel Sternlein stehen

References

Further reading 
 Rolf Wilhelm Brednich, Lutz Röhrich, Wolfgang Suppan: Handbuch des Volksliedes. München 1973/1975
 Werner Danckert: Das Volkslied im Abendland. Francke, Bern 1966
 Werner Danckert: Das europäische Volkslied. Bouvier, Bonn 1970.
 Werner Danckert: Symbol, Metapher, Allegorie im Lied der Völker. 4 Teile. Verlag für systematische Musikwissenschaft, Bonn-Bad Godesberg 1976–1978.
 Ernst Klusen: Volkslied. Fund und Erfindung. Gerig, Köln 1969.
 Ernst Klusen: Zur Situation des Singens in der Bundesrepublik Deutschland. Gerig, Köln 1974/1975.
 Joseph Müller-Blattau: Das deutsche Volkslied. Hesse, Berlin 1932.
 Wolfgang Suppan: Volkslied – Seine Sammlung und Erforschung. Metzler, Stuttgart 1978.
 Wolfgang Suppan (et al.): Volksgesang, Volksmusik, Volkstanz. In: MGG 1
 Monika Tibbe, Manfred Bonson: Folk, Folklore, Volkslied: Zur Situation in- und ausländischer Volksmusik in der Bundesrepublik. Stuttgart, 1981.

External links 
 
 
 Center for Popular Culture and Music (Deutsches Volksliedarchiv) University of Freiburg
 Volksliederarchiv volksliederarchiv.de